Hibiscus 'Albo Lacinatus' is a cultivar of Hibiscus that was hybridized no later than the late 1700s or early 1800s, making it one of the earliest Hibiscus cultivars. A tropical hibiscus, it is one of the fastest growing, tallest, and most vigorous of all tropical hibiscus species and cultivars.

Description

Featuring an evergreen foliage, it grows 4.7-6 m tall (15-20 ft) and has a width of 2.4-3 m (8-10 ft). Fast growing, it reaches of 6 metres (20 ft) or more in about 5 years. Its pale pink flowers bloom from mid summer to early autumn.

It is similar in appearance to the 'Dainty Pink' cultivar.

Cultivation
Heat and drought tolerant, it can be grown as a specimen tree or as a hedge bush, and it's hardy from zone 8b to 11. It requires winter protection in colder areas.

See also
List of Hibiscus cultivars

References

Albo Lacinatus
Ornamental plant cultivars